Triple Concerto No. 2, a composer's second triple concerto, may refer to:
 Concerto for Three Harpsichords and Orchestra No. 2, BWV 1064, a concerto by Johann Sebastian Bach before c. 1742
 Concertante in D, WoO unv 5, Gardi  3, an unfinished concerto by Ludwig van Beethoven
 Triple Concerto No. 2 (Smirnov), a 2003 concerto by Dmitri Smirnov

See also
 Triple concerto